Sh'or Yoshuv is a Haredi yeshiva in Lawrence, New York.  It was founded in 1967 by Rabbi Shlomo Freifeld, former mashgiach ruchani ("dean of students") at Yeshiva Rabbi Chaim Berlin. The yeshiva was located in Far Rockaway from its inception until 2003, when it moved to its current location in Lawrence, New York. The yeshiva facilities include a large Bais Medrash, classrooms, English and Hebrew libraries, a gymnasium, a large hall for community events and dormitory accommodations.

Student body
The yeshiva accepts students from the age of 17 and older. Students enter the yeshiva with a diverse range of backgrounds and educational experience. The student body comes to Sh’or Yoshuv from the surrounding community as well as locations all over the world.

Academics

The yeshiva has both organized shiurim (lectures) and chaburas (peer groups) for the students and for the local community. The student divide their day into the traditional morning, afternoon and night study session (sedarim). A weekly Kollel on Sunday is geared towards members of the community.

The Yeshiva accommodates for those students who are in college or work in the afternoon.

Sh'or Yoshuv has recently included a semicha (Rabbinical Ordination) program under Rabbi Eliyahu Schneider (the first "graduates" received their semicha in the 2006-2007 year). The Yeshiva offers a Bachelor of Talmudic Law.

External links
 

Baalei teshuva institutions
Educational institutions established in 1967
Haredi Judaism in New York (state)
Jewish seminaries
Mesivtas
Orthodox yeshivas in Nassau County, NY
Universities and colleges in Nassau County, New York